Threa Almontaser is the award-winning author of The Wild Fox of Yemen, nominated for the National Book Award, the NAACP Image Award for Outstanding Literary Work, and the Pen/Voelcker Award for Poetry. Her debut has received widespread national recognition, including the Walt Whitman Award from the Academy of American Poets, the Maya Angelou Book Award, the Arab American Book Award, and the Brooklyn Public Library Literary Prize.

Early life and education
Threa Almontaser learned English in elementary school and began writing short stories and poems at a very young age, primarily in the form of scribbles that she read out loud to her family. She earned her MFA in Creative Writing and her TESOL certification from North Carolina State University.

Career
Almontaser's debut poetry collection, The Wild Fox of Yemen (Graywolf Press), was selected by Harryette Mullen as winner of the 2020 Walt Whitman Award established by the Academy of American Poets. The Whitman Award was established in 1975 to encourage emerging poets who have not published a poetry collection. Mullen described Almontaser's work: “These poems sing and celebrate a vibrant, rebellious body with all its physical and spiritual entanglements. Formally and linguistically diverse, these bold, defiant declarations of ‘reckless’ embodiment acknowledge the self's nesting identities, proclaiming the individual's intricate relations to others, the one in the many and the many in the one. Ultimately, they ask how to belong to others without losing oneself, how to be faithful to oneself without forsaking others." 

Almontaser has been published for the Pushcart Prize, Best of The Net, and the Best New Poets series. She is a recipient of the Unsilenced Grant for Muslim American Women Writers, and has received support from Duke, National Endowment for the Arts, and the Fulbright Program. Along with writing books, Almontaser also teaches English to immigrants and refugees in her area.

Selected publications
 The Wild Fox of Yemen, (Graywolf Press, 2021)

References 

Year of birth missing (living people)
Living people

American women poets
21st-century American poets
21st-century American women writers
People from New York City
American people of Yemeni descent